Utricularia inflexa is a medium to large sized suspended aquatic carnivorous plant that belongs to the genus Utricularia. It is probably a perennial plant. U. inflexa is endemic to Africa and the Indian subcontinent.

See also 
 List of Utricularia species

References

External links 
Utricularia inflexa in Brunken, U., Schmidt, M., Dressler, S., Janssen, T., Thiombiano, A. & Zizka, G. 2008. West African plants - A Photo Guide. www.westafricanplants.senckenberg.de.
Georeferenced occurrence data for Utricularia inflexa from GBIF

inflexa
Carnivorous plants of Africa
Carnivorous plants of Asia
Flora of Africa
Flora of the Indian subcontinent
Plants described in 1775